

B

B